Thomas Scawen  (died 1774) was a British politician who sat in the House of Commons from  1727 to 1741.
 
Scawen was the son of Sir Thomas Scawen and his wife Martha Wessell, the daughter of Abraham Wessell, a London merchant.   In 1722 he inherited the property of his uncle Sir William Scawen which included Carshalton Park. He married Tryphena Russell, daughter of Lord James Russell of Maidwell, Northamptonshire on 8 June 1725.

Scawen was returned as Member of Parliament for Surrey in a by-election on 12 April 1727. He was an opposition Whig. At the 1727 general election he joined interests with John Walter, the other outgoing Member,  against Arthur Onslow. Walter tried to step down when it was apparent that the poll was going in Onslow's favour, but the sheriff  ruled that the poll must proceed. Scawen obtained a small majority over Walter by the second votes of Onslow's supporters. In the 1734 general election he was re-elected unopposed with Onslow. He voted regularly with the Opposition. He did not stand again in 1741 but in 1747 he used his interest at Mitchell to bring in Thomas Clarke for that borough at the request of Lord Chancellor Hardwicke. He also brought in his son James Scawen at Mitchell in 1761.

Scawen died on 11 February 1774. His daughter Tryphena married  Henry Bathurst, 2nd Earl Bathurst.

References

Sources

1774 deaths
British MPs 1727–1734
British MPs 1734–1741
Members of the Parliament of Great Britain for English constituencies